666 Live is a 2007 live CD/DVD album by Canadian rock band Billy Talent. It has three of the band's European performances from their past tour, which took them around the globe multiple times over eighteen months in support of their latest studio album Billy Talent II. The basic version includes footage of six songs each from the shows at London's Brixton Academy, Düsseldorf's Philips Halle and Germany's Rock Am Ring Festival (at the Nürburgring). A second disc has the audio portion of the entire Düsseldorf concert. The deluxe edition is a 2-DVD/CD that expands the shows on two DVDs. The album is produced by Pierre and Francois Lamoureux, who have worked with The Tragically Hip and The Who.

Track listing

Basic version 
Live DVD
Performances at Brixton Academy, London
This Is How It Goes
Devil in a Midnight Mass
This Suffering
Standing in the Rain
Navy Song
Worker Bees

Performances at the Phillipshalle, Düsseldorf
Line & Sinker
The Ex
Surrender
Prisoners of Today
River Below
Red Flag

Performances at the Rock Am Ring Festival, Nürburgring
Perfect World
Sympathy
Try Honesty
Nothing to Lose
Fallen Leaves
Red Flag

Live CD

Live at the Phillipshalle in Düsseldorf
This Is How It Goes
Devil in a Midnight Mass
This Suffering
Line & Sinker
Standing in the Rain
The Navy Song
Worker Bees
The Ex
Surrender
Prisoners of Today
River Below
Perfect World
Sympathy
Try Honesty
Nothing to Lose
Fallen Leaves
Red Flag

Deluxe version 
Brixton DVD
This Is How It Goes
Devil in a Midnight Mass
This Suffering
Line & Sinker
Standing in the Rain
The Navy Song
Worker Bees
The Ex
Prisoners of Today
Fallen Leaves
Perfect World
Sympathy
Try Honesty
Nothing to Lose
River Below
Red Flag

Düsseldorf DVD
This Is How It Goes
Devil in a Midnight Mass
This Suffering
Line & Sinker
Standing in the Rain
The Navy Song
Worker Bees
The Ex
Surrender
Prisoners of Today
River Below
Perfect World
Sympathy
Try Honesty
Nothing to Lose
Fallen Leaves
Red Flag

Live CD
Live at the Phillipshalle in Düsseldorf
This Is How It Goes
Devil in a Midnight Mass
This Suffering
Line & Sinker
Standing in the Rain
The Navy Song
Worker Bees
The Ex
Surrender
Prisoners of Today
River Below
Perfect World
Sympathy
Try Honesty
Nothing to Lose
Fallen Leaves
Red Flag

The Deluxe edition also includes a hidden video on the disc which can be accessed on the very first menu when This Suffering is playing. On one of the cards a symbol turns yellow and you have to quickly press play because the menu is only short. The video shows Ian D'Sa doing his hair before a concert. Another bonus feature is photos of the band on and off stage. There are also videos in between concerts of Brixton, Düsseldorf and Nuremberg. They also talk about their former band Pezz and how they held shows. The Basic Version Contains just the Live CD.

Charts

Awards 
The album/DVD won a Juno Award for Music DVD of the Year on April 5, 2008.

References 

Billy Talent albums
2007 live albums
2007 video albums
Live video albums